The Raigam Tele'es Best Teledrama Lighting & Cameraman Award is presented annually in Sri Lanka by the Kingdom of Raigam associated with many commercial brands for the best Sri Lankan cinematographer of the year in television.

The award was first given in 2005. Following is a list of the winners of this prestigious title since then.

Award list in each year

References

Performing arts awards
Raigam Tele'es